David Lawrence Cornelius McCay (18 November 1943 – 20 September 2016) was a South African cricketer. He played seventeen first-class matches for Western Province between 1966 and 1974.

References

External links
 

1943 births
2016 deaths
South African cricketers
Western Province cricketers